Efferia latruncula is a species of robber flies in the family Asilidae.

References

Further reading

External links

 

Asilinae
Taxa named by Samuel Wendell Williston
Insects described in 1885